The streaked scrub warbler (Scotocerca inquieta), also known simply as the scrub warbler, is a small passerine bird. It is the only species placed in the genus Scotocerca. It is found in northern Africa and south-western Asia. It is a bird of desert fringes, frequenting scrubby areas, ravines and gorges, and is mainly resident, although local movements can occur outside the breeding season.

The genus is placed in its own family Scotocercidae. Some taxonomic authorities expand the family to include the closely-related Cettiidae and Erythrocercidae.

Taxonomy
The streaked scrub warbler was formally described and illustrated in 1830 by the German physician Philipp Jakob Cretzschmar under the binomial name Malurus inquietus. This species is now the only bird placed in the genus Scotocerca that was introduced in 1872 by the Swedish zoologist Carl Jakob Sundevall with the streaked scrub warbler as the type species. The genus name Scotocerca combines the Ancient Greek skotos meaning "dark" or "darkness" (from skotoō "to darken") with kerkos meaning "tail". The specific inquieta is from Latin inquietus meaning "restless". The genus is placed in its own family Scotocercidae that was introduced in 2012 by Silke Fregin and collaborators.

The streaked scrub warbler was formerly sometimes placed in the family Cisticolidae. David Winkler and colleagues include this species in an enlarged family Scotocercidae that includes the families Cettiidae and Erythrocercidae.

Eight subspecies are recognised:
 S. i. theresae Meinertzhagen R, 1939 – Mauritania, southwest and central Morocco 
 S. i. saharae (Loche, 1858) – east Morocco to Libya 
 S. i. inquieta (Cretzschmar, 1830) – northeast Egypt to northwest Arabia
 S. i. grisea Bates, 1936 – west Saudi Arabia, east Yemen and Oman 
 S. i. buryi Ogilvie-Grant, 1902 – south Saudi Arabia and west Yemen 
 S. i. montana Stepanyan, 1970 – Iran, south Turkmenistan, south Tajikistan and Afghanistan 
 S. i. platyura (Severtsov, 1873) – Kazakhstan, Uzbekistan, north Turkmenistan and southwest Tajikistan
 S. i. striata (Brooks W.E., 1872) – south-central Iraq, south Iran and Pakistan

Some authorities split the streaked scrub warbler into two species, the Saharan scrub warbler (Scotocerca saharae, including subspecies theresae) and the Levant scrub warbler (Scotocerca inquieta, including all other subspecies), an approach which has been followed in the most recent version of the Collins Bird Guide.

Description
The streaked scrub warbler is a small, skulking desert warbler which cocks its tail over its back. The adults are grey brown above, finely streaked with dark brown. They have a broad pale supercilium and a thin black eyestripe. The underparts are whitish with reddish flanks and vent, the breast is finely streaked. The tail is graduated and dark brown with a white tip. Juveniles are duller.

The song of the streaked scrub warbler is distinctive and is rendered as "''zit-zit dweedle-doolredle-doleed"

Distribution and habitat
The streaked scrub warbler is a bird of open desert with a sparse cover of scrub, especially wadi beds with a denser cover than the surrounding desert, as well as scree areas with bushes in ravines and gorges.

Behaviour

Breeding
The streaked scrub warbler nests in low scrub up to 1.5m above the ground, the nest is a domed structure made of grass and twigs and lined with feathers, fur and plant down. It has 1-2 side entrances, and if there is a second it is used only as an exit.  The clutch size averages 3–5 but varies from 2–5, incubation is roughly two weeks with another two weeks before the young fledge.

Food and feeding
Its main food is insects but it will also eat seeds which may be very important in winter. It forages on the ground, fossicking through leaf litter and other debris under bushes, and into cavities but will also feed up in the vegetation at times.

Status
The streaked scrub warbler has a very wide range and is scarce in some places and common in others. No particular threats have been identified and the population is believed to be steady or declining slightly. The International Union for Conservation of Nature has rated its conservation status as being of "least concern".

Gallery

References

External links
 Recordings of the streaked scrub warbler at Xeno-Canto

streaked scrub warbler
Birds of North Africa
Birds of the Middle East
Birds of Central Asia
Birds of Afghanistan
Birds of Pakistan
streaked scrub warbler
streaked scrub warbler
Taxonomy articles created by Polbot